Giuseppe Furino (born 5 July 1946) is an Italian retired footballer who played as a midfielder. A small yet tenacious and physical player, Furino was nicknamed Furia, and was known for his work-rate and energy in midfield, as well as his ability to break down possession as a defensive midfielder, although he was also gifted with good technical skills. He began his club career with Savona in 1966, and later spent a season with Palermo in 1968. In 1969, he moved to Juventus, where he remained for 13 seasons, also serving as the club's captain, and achieved great success, winning several domestic and international titles, including an Italian record of eight Serie A championships. At international level, he represented Italy at the 1970 FIFA World Cup, where he won a runners-up medal.

Club career
Furino was born in Palermo. Having originally started his career at Juventus as a youngster he played for Savona Calcio and U.S. Città di Palermo.

He made his Serie A debut for Palermo against Cagliari on 29 August 1968, and he then transferred to Juventus for the 1969–70 season.

Furino made his debut for Juventus in a Coppa Italia match against Mantova F.C. on 31 August 1969. He was to go on and play for Juventus for 15 successive seasons, with his last match coming against Avellino on 6 May 1984. In all he made 361 Serie A appearances for Juventus, and 528 in all senior competitions for them, scoring 19 goals, also serving as the team's captain.

He won eight Italian league championships with Juventus. This is the most Italian titles a player has won, a record he shares with Giovanni Ferrari and Gianluigi Buffon (Virginio Rosetta also won eight national championships, but three of them came before the formation of a professional Serie A). During his time with Juventus, he also won the Coppa Italia twice, as well as an UEFA Cup, and a European Cup Winners' Cup, also reaching the European Cup final in 1973 and 1983, as well as the 1973 Intercontinental Cup final.

International career
Furino played three times for the Italy national team between 1970 and 1974, and he also took part at the 1970 FIFA World Cup with Italy, where they reached the final. He made his international debut during the tournament, in Italy's match against Uruguay on 6 June 1970, coming on as a substitute for Angelo Domenghini.

Style of play
Despite his small stature, Furino was a tenacious and tactically versatile player, who excelled in his defensive midfield role due to his strong physique. Nicknamed "Furia" (Fury) by the Juventus fans, he was known as an aggressive, hard-working, and hard-tackling ball-winner, whose main attributes were his pace, stamina, and his ability to read the game. He was also a team player, and he possessed good technical ability despite his playing role.

Honours
Juventus
 Serie A: 1971–72, 1972–73, 1974–75, 1976–77, 1977–78, 1980–81, 1981–82, 1983–84
 Coppa Italia: 1978–79, 1982–83
 UEFA Cup: 1976–77
 UEFA Cup Winners' Cup: 1983–84
 Intercontinental Cup: Runner-up: 1973
 European Cup: Runner-up: 1972–73, 1982–83
 Inter-Cities Fairs Cup Runner-up: 1970-71

Italy
 FIFA World Cup: runner-up 1970

References

1946 births
Living people
1970 FIFA World Cup players
Italian footballers
Italy international footballers
Association football midfielders
Serie A players
Serie B players
Serie C players
Juventus F.C. players
Palermo F.C. players
Savona F.B.C. players
Footballers from Palermo
UEFA Cup winning players
People of Campanian descent